Goin'gyibug is a township in the northeast of Ngamring County, north-central Shigatse, western Tibet Autonomous Region, China. It has six villages under its administration.

See also
List of towns and villages in Tibet

References

Populated places in Shigatse
Township-level divisions of Tibet